The 1980–81 John Player Cup was the tenth edition of England's premier rugby union club competition at the time. Leicester won the competition for a third consecutive year defeating Gosforth in the final. The competition was extended with extra rounds replacing the previous format of 32 teams only. The event was sponsored by John Player cigarettes and the final was held at Twickenham Stadium.

Draw and results

First round
   
Away team progress*

Second round

Third round

Fourth round

Quarter-finals

London Scottish progressed on more tries rule*

Semi-finals

Final

References

1980–81 rugby union tournaments for clubs
John Player Cup
RFU Knockout Cup